Bearing balls are special highly spherical and smooth balls, most commonly used in ball bearings, but also used as components in things like freewheel mechanisms.  The balls come in many different grades. These grades are defined by bodies such as the American Bearing Manufacturers Association (ABMA), a body which sets standards for the precision of bearing balls. They are manufactured in machines designed specially for the job.

In 2008, the United States produced 5.778 billion bearing balls.

Grade
Bearing balls are manufactured to a specific grade, which defines its geometric tolerances. The grades range from 2000 to 3, where the smaller the number the higher the precision. Grades are written "GXXXX", i.e. grade 100 would be "G100". Lower grades also have fewer defects, such as flats, pits, soft spots, and cuts. The surface smoothness is measured in two ways: surface roughness and waviness.

Size refers to the farthest possible distance between two points on the ball's surface, as measured by two parallel plates in contact with the surface. The starting size is the nominal ball diameter, which is the nominal, or theoretical, ball diameter. The ball size is then determined by measuring the ball diameter variation, which is the difference between the largest and smallest diameter measurement. For a given lot there is a lot diameter variation, which is the difference between the mean diameter of the largest ball and the smallest ball of the lot.

Sphericity, or deviation from spherical form, refers to how much the ball deviates from a true spherical form (out of roundness). The resulting polar graph is then circumscribed with the smallest circle possible and the difference between this circumscribed circle and the nominal ball diameter is the variation.

Manufacture
The manufacture of bearing balls depends on the type of material the balls are being made from.

Metal

Metal balls start as a wire. The wire is sheared to give a pellet with a volume approximately that of the ball with the desired outer diameter (OD). This pellet is then headed into a rough spherical shape. Next, the balls are fed into a machine that de-flashes them. The machine does this by feeding the balls between two heavy cast iron or hardened steel plates, called rill plates. One of the plates is held stationary while the other rotates. The top plate has an opening to allow balls to enter and exit the rill plates. These plates have fine circumferential grooves that the balls track in. The balls are run through the machine long enough so that each ball passes through many of these grooves, which ensures each ball is the same size, even if a particular groove is out of specification. The controllable machine variables are the amount of pressure applied, the speed of the plates, and how long the balls are left in the machine.

During the operation coolant is pumped between the rill plates because the high pressure between the plates and friction creates considerable heat. The high pressure applied to the balls also induces cold working, which strengthens the balls.

Sometimes the balls are then run through a soft grinding process afterward to improve precision. This is done in the same type of machine, but the rill plates are replaced with grinding stones.

If the balls are steel they are then heat treated. After heat treatment they are descaled to remove any residue or by-products.

The balls are then hard ground. They are ground in the same type of machine as used before, but either an abrasive is introduced into coolant or the rotating plate is replaced with a very hard fine-grain grinding wheel. This step can get the balls within ±. If the balls need more precision then they are lapped, again in the same type of machine. However, this time the rill plates are made of a softer material, usually cast iron, less pressure is applied, the plate is rotated slowly. This step is what gives bearing balls their shiny appearance and can bring the balls between grades 10 and 48.

If even more precision is needed then proprietary chemical and mechanical processes are usually used.

The inspection of bearing balls was one of the case studies in Frederick Winslow Taylor's classic Principles of Scientific Management.

Plastic
Plastic bearing balls are made in the same manner as described above.

Ceramic

Ceramic bearing balls are made of sintered materials that are then ground to size and shape as above. Common materials include: silicon nitride and zirconium dioxide.

Materials
Common materials include carbon steel, stainless steel, chrome steel, brass, aluminium, tungsten carbide, platinum, gold, titanium, plastic. Other less common materials include copper, monel, k-monel, lead, silver, glass, and niobium.

See also
 Steel shot

References

Bearings (mechanical)
Hardware (mechanical)
Metalworking
Rolling-element bearings